The women's tournament of water polo at the 2011 Summer Universiade at Shenzhen, China began on August 12 and ended on August 22.

Teams

Preliminary round

Group A

Group B

Quarterfinals

Semifinal Round

Classification 5–9 places

Semifinals

Final round

Classification 7–9 places

Final 5–6 places

Bronze Medal match

Gold Medal match

Final standings

External links
Schedule
Reports

Water polo at the 2011 Summer Universiade